Margarita Piel McCoy (May 25, 1923 — March 31, 2016) was an American urban planner and educator. McCoy was among the first women in the United States to achieve academic tenure as a professor of urban planning, and the first to chair an urban planning department.

Career
Born to Rudolf Alfred Piel and Margarita Schiele, both from brewing families, McCoy is a descendant of the originators of Piels Beer. After finishing high school in Garden City, New York, in 1940, she attended Wells College and Northwestern University. However, McCoy ultimately transferred to Boston University, where she received in Bachelor of Arts in 1944.

In 1959, she began her career by serving as the planning commissioner for Sudbury, Massachusetts. In 1970, McCoy received her Master of Urban Planning from the University of Southern California Sol Price School of Public Policy. McCoy taught at California State Polytechnic University, Pomona, where she served as Chair of the Department of Urban and Regional Planning (1977-1983), as well as at the University of Southern California. She retired in 1989.

McCoy was an active member of the Association of Collegiate Schools of Planning (ACSP), the American Planning Association (APA), the Planning Accreditation Board (PAB), and the American Institute of Certified Planners (AICP) of which she was president from 1981-1982 and was named fellow.

In 1998, the ACSP established the Margarita McCoy Award, which biannually recognizes individuals who have made an outstanding contribution toward the advancement of women in planning at institutions of higher education through service, teaching, and/or research. Notable winners have included Eugenie L. Birch (1995), Karen R. Polenske (2001), Dolores Hayden (2006), and Daphne Spain (2008).

Awards
2006 - American Planning Association National Women in Planning Award
2008 - University of Southern California Sol Price School of Public Policy Alumni Guardian Award
2018 - American Planning Association National Planning Excellence Planning Pioneers Award

Personal life
McCoy married Alfred Mudge McCoy, Jr. on June 10, 1941 in Concord, Massachusetts.

References

External links
APA profile

1923 births
2016 deaths
American people of German descent
People from Long Island
People from La Habra, California
Boston University alumni
USC Sol Price School of Public Policy alumni
American urban planners
Women urban planners
California State Polytechnic University, Pomona faculty
University of Southern California faculty